Robert Squibbe (died 1462 or after) of Shaftesbury, Dorset, was an English Member of Parliament and lawyer.

He was a Member (MP) of the Parliament of England for Shaftesbury in 1419, 1420, May 1421, December 1421, 1422 and 1423.

References

Year of birth missing
15th-century deaths
English MPs 1419
People from Shaftesbury
English MPs 1420
English MPs May 1421
English MPs 1422
English MPs 1423